Magomedshamil Magomedovich Abduragimov (  1 January 1980 – 9 October 2005), was a Kumyk senior lieutenant and operative of Militsiya. He was posthumously awarded the title Hero of the Russian Federation for preventing a major terrorist act.

In October 2005 during a military check-in of the selected address at Pervomayskaya Street in Mahachkala of the Republic of Dagestan, a group of operatives was attacked, with two of them wounded and two killed. While major Sergey Podvalny did not let militants leave the surrounded house until the end, Magomedshamil entered the house and neutralized the terrorist who was planting an explosive bomb.

Magomedshamil was the only son of his mother Marzhanat Abduragimovna.

See also
List of Heroes of the Russian Federation

References

External links
President of Dagestan Republic handed Magomedshamil Abduragimov's star of Hero over to his mother, Kumukia.ru, 28 July 2006
Stars from President, Rossiyskaya Gazeta, July 2006

1980 births
2005 deaths
People from Karabudakhkentsky District
Russian police officers
Heroes of the Russian Federation